Săgeata is a commune in Buzău County, Muntenia, Romania. It is composed of seven villages: Banița, Beilic, Bordușani, Dâmbroca, Găvănești, Movilița and Săgeata.

Notes

Communes in Buzău County
Localities in Muntenia